Nasser Al-Ghanem (born 4 April 1961) is a former Kuwaiti football midfielder who played for Kuwait in the 1982 FIFA World Cup,  he also played for Kazma Sporting Club.

References

External links

1961 births
Kuwaiti footballers
Kuwait international footballers
Association football midfielders
1982 FIFA World Cup players
Living people
Asian Games medalists in football
Footballers at the 1982 Asian Games
Footballers at the 1986 Asian Games
1980 AFC Asian Cup players
1988 AFC Asian Cup players
AFC Asian Cup-winning players
Asian Games silver medalists for Kuwait
Medalists at the 1982 Asian Games
Kazma SC players
Kuwait Premier League players